Polotsk is a historical city in Belarus, situated on the Dvina River. It is the administrative center of Polotsk District in Vitebsk Region. Its population is more than 80,000 people. It is served by Polotsk Airport and Borovitsy air base.

Nomenclature 

The Old East Slavic name, Polotesk, derives from the Polota river, which flows into the neighboring Western Dvina. The Vikings rendered that name as Palteskja.

Geography

Lakes
Lake Babyna

History

Polotsk is one of the most ancient cities of the Eastern Slavs. The Primary Chronicle (a history of Kievan Rus' from about 850 to 1110, compiled in Kiev about 1113) listed Polotsk in 862 (as Полотескъ, /poloteskŭ/), together with Murom and Belozersk. However, an archaeological expedition from the Institute of History of the National Academy of Sciences of Belarus suggests that Polotsk existed in the first half of the 9th century.

The first known prince of Polotsk was Rogvolod (ruled 945–978). He had two sons and a daughter named  Rogneda. Rogvolod promised Rogneda to the  prince of Kiev,  Yaropolk, as a wife. But Yaropolk's brother,  Vladimir, had attacked Polotsk before Yaropolk came. He killed Rogvolod, his wife and sons, and married Rogneda. 

Vladimir and Rogneda had five children and the eldest of them,  Izyaslav, became Prince of Polotsk (ruled 989–1001). 

Between the 10th and 12th centuries, the Principality of Polotsk emerged as the dominant center of power in what is now Belarusian territory, with a lesser role played by the Principality of Turov to the south. It repeatedly asserted its sovereignty in relation to other centers of Kievan Rus, becoming a political capital, the episcopal see and the controller of vassal territories among Balts in the west. Its most powerful ruler was Prince Vseslav Bryachislavich, who reigned from 1044 to 1101. A 12th-century inscription commissioned by Vseslav's son  Boris may still be seen on a huge boulder installed near the St. Sophia Cathedral. For a full list of the Polotsk rulers, see the list of Belarusian rulers.

 
During the Mongol invasion Polotsk avoided being invaded or paying tribute to the Golden Horde. But in 1240, it became a vassal of the Lithuanian princes. The Grand Duke of Lithuania Vytenis annexed the city by military force in 1307, completing the process which the Lithuanian princes had begun in the 1250s. Polotsk received a charter of autonomy guaranteeing that the grand dukes "will not introduce new, nor destroy the old". It was the earliest to be so incorporated into the Grand Duchy of Lithuania. By doing so, the Lithuanians managed to firmly grasp the Dvina trade route in their hands, securing an important element for the surrounding economies. Magdeburg law was adopted in 1498. Polotsk functioned as a capital of the Połock Voivodship of the Polish–Lithuanian Commonwealth until 1772. Captured by the Russian army of Ivan the Terrible in 1563, it was returned to the Grand Duchy of Lithuania just 15 years later. It was again captured by Russia on 17 June 1654, but recaptured by Poland–Lithuania on 30 October 1660 during the Russo-Polish War (1654–67).

In 1772 Russia seized Polotsk (then Połock) as part of the First Partition of the Polish–Lithuanian Commonwealth. 

Since the Russian Empress Catherine II did not acknowledge the Papal suppression of the Society of Jesus (1773–1814), the Jesuit branches in these lands were not disbanded, and Połock became the European centre of the  Order, with a novitiate opening in 1780, and with the arrival of distinguished Jesuits from other parts of Europe who brought with them valuable books and scientific collections. Jesuits continued their pastoral work and upgraded the Jesuit College in Polotsk (opened in 1580 by decree of the Polish king Stefan Batory, with the Jesuit Piotr Skarga (1536–1612) as its first rector) into the Połock Academy (1812–1820), with three faculties (Theology, Languages and Liberal Arts), four libraries, a printing house, a bookshop, a theatre with 3 stages, a science museum, an art gallery and a scientific and literary periodical, and a medical-care centre. The school was also the patron of the college in Petersburg, the mission to Saratov and an expedition to Canton. 

During the French invasion of Russia the district saw two battles, the First Battle of Polotsk (August 1812) and the Second Battle of Polotsk (October 1812).

In 1820 pressure from the Russian Orthodox Church influenced the Russian Emperor  Alexander I to exile the Jesuits and to close the Polock Academy, there were 700 students studying there. The Russian authorities also broke up the Academy's library of 40,000–60,000 volumes, the richest collection of 16th- to 18th-century books — the books went to St. Petersburg, Kiev and other cities, 4000 volumes (along with books from other closed Jesuit schools) going to the  St. Petersburg State University Scientific Library.

Polotsk came under occupation by the German Empire between 25 February 1918 and 21 November 1918 in World War I, by Poland between 22 September 1919 and 14 May 1920 in the Polish–Soviet War and by Nazi Germany between 16 July 1941 and 4 July 1944 in World War II. Polotsk functioned as the center of Polatsk Voblast between 20 September 1944 and 8 January 1954. A reorganisation of the area between Vitebsk and Molodechno  voblasts left Polotsk part of the former.

Cultural heritage

The city's Saint Sophia Cathedral (1044–1066) was a symbol of the independent-mindedness of Polotsk, rivaling churches of the same name in Novgorod and Kyiv.  The name referred to the original Hagia Sophia in Constantinople, and thus claims imperial prestige, authority and sovereignty. The cathedral had been ruined by the troops of Peter I of Russia. Hence the present baroque building by Johann Christoph Glaubitz dates from the mid-18th century.  Some genuine 12th-century architecture (notably Transfiguration Church) survives in the Convent of Saint Euphrosyne, which also features a neo-Byzantine cathedral, designed and built in 1893—1899 by Vladimir Korshikov.

Cultural achievements of the medieval period include the work of the nun Euphrosyne of Polotsk (1120–1173), who built monasteries, transcribed books, promoted literacy and sponsored art (including local artisan Lazarus Bohsha's famous "Cross of Saint Euphrosyne," a national symbol and treasure lost during World War II), and the prolific, original Church Slavonic sermons and writings of Bishop Cyril of Turaw (1130–1182).

The first Belarusian printer, Francysk Skaryna, was born in Polotsk around 1490. He is famous for being the first to print the Bible in the Old Belarusian language (East Slavic language) in 1517, several decades after the first-ever printed book by Johann Gutenberg and just several years after the first Czech Bible (1506).

In September 2003, as "Days of Belarusian Literacy" were celebrated for the 10th time in Polotsk, city authorities dedicated a monument to honor the unique Cyrillic Belarusian letter Ў, which is not used in any other Slavic language. The original idea for the monument came from the Belarusian calligraphy professor Paval Siemchanka, who has been studying Cyrillic scripts for many years.

Sports
The city has produced players for the Belarus national bandy team. In October 2011, the team planned to participate in the Russian Cup in rink bandy, but did not after all.

Notable people
 Uładzimir Arłou (b. 1953), Belarusian historian and writer
 Lyavon Barshchewski (b. 1958), Belarusian philologist and politician
 Boris Galerkin
 Andrei of Polotsk
 Bryachislav of Polotsk
 Euphrosyne of Polotsk
 Francysk Skaryna
 Gabriel Lenkiewicz
 Izyaslav of Polotsk
 Josaphat Kuntsevych (c.1580-1623) Basilian monk, Archeparch of Polotsk and Vitebsk, and Saint in the Roman Catholic Church
 Mary Antin
 Rogneda of Polotsk
 Rogvolod
 Rogvolod Vseslavich
 Sophia of Minsk, Queen of Denmark
 Symeon of Polotsk
 Vseslav of Polotsk
 Vyacheslav Gordanov
 Marina Osman
 Igor Shitov

Gallery

See also
 Krivichs
 Novopolotsk
 Plock

References

External links

Official site of the city of Połack - Официальный сайт города Полоцка
Polotsk 
Polotsk Chat Forum
Polacak
Photos on Radzima.org
Polotsk historic images
Weather Polotsk
ePOLOTSK.com
 

 
Cities in Belarus
Populated places in Vitebsk Region
Polotsky Uyezd
Polotsk Voivodeship
Polochans
Magdeburg rights
Trading posts of the Hanseatic League